Since the season 2012-13, Montenegrin women's football clubs are playing in UEFA competitions. Until now, every season, one team from Montenegrin Women's League is participating in European football cups.

List of matches
From 2012-13 season, champion of Montenegrin Women's League is playing in the UEFA Women's Champions League. In period 2012-2015, the only Montenegrin representative was ŽFK Ekonomist. From season 2016-17 to 2020-21, Montenegro was represented in UEFA Champions League by ŽFK Breznica.
Below is the list of Montenegrin clubs' matches in European competitions.

Performances by clubs
During the overall history, two different Montenegrin clubs played in European women's football competitions. Below is a table with Montenegrin clubs' scores in UEFA competitions.

As of the end of UEFA competitions 2020–21 season.

Scores by opponents' countries
Below is the list of performances of Montenegrin clubs against opponents in UEFA competitions by their countries (football federations).

As of the end of UEFA competitions 2020–21 season.

See also
Football in Montenegro
Montenegrin Women's League
Montenegrin Cup (women)

Europe
Women
Women's sports leagues in Montenegro